Walsh Park is a GAA stadium in Waterford, Ireland named after Willie Walsh, a well-known referee and long time campaigner for Gaelic games in Waterford. It is one of the two homes of the Waterford Gaelic football and hurling teams, the other being Fraher Field in Dungarvan. The two grounds are rivals for important games, former Waterford hurling manager Davy Fitzgerald saying "There's this endless battle between Walsh Park and Fraher Field, a political battle almost. If one field gets a game, the other has to get the next one. Dungarvan was a nice field, but my personal preference was always Walsh Park, because I felt it had more of the feel of a fortress."

Walsh Park is named after Willie Walsh, who refereed many All-Ireland SFC and SHC finals, including the 1916 All-Ireland Senior Hurling Championship Final.

Redevelopment
The stadium was set to undergo a €7m redevelopment to result in an increased capacity of 16,500 by 2020. However, delays because of COVID-19 and increased costs mean completion is not expected until 2023.

See also
 List of Gaelic Athletic Association stadiums
 List of stadiums in Ireland by capacity

References

External links
 Walsh Park
 Walsh Park on ticketmaster.ie
 Walsh Park

Gaelic games grounds in the Republic of Ireland
Sport in Waterford (city)
Sports venues in County Waterford